Necropsobacter is a Gram-negative and non-motile genus of bacteria from the family of Pasteurellaceae.

References

Pasteurellales
Bacteria genera